The Randwick Guineas is an Australian Turf Club Group One Thoroughbred horse race for three-year-olds, run at set weights over a distance of 1600 metres at Randwick Racecourse in Sydney, Australia in March as a part of the Sydney Autumn Carnival. Total prize money for the race is A$1 million.

History
The winner of this race automatically qualifies for a berth in the Australian Derby and Doncaster Mile

This race is the first leg of the Australian Three Year Old "Triple Crown" consisting of the Rosehill Guineas (2000 metres) and Australian Derby (2400 metres).

Name
This race replaced the former event Canterbury Guineas, which was discontinued after the 2005 running after the Australian Jockey Club and the Sydney Turf Club implemented major program changes streamlining the major races into the race calendar.
As the Canterbury Guineas the race was originally run in the spring in early September but after 1978 the race was run early in the autumn as prep race for the rich Sydney carnival.

Distance
 1935–1956 - 9 furlongs 80 yards (~1850 metres)
 1957 - 1 mile  furlongs (~1950 metres)
 1958–1972 - 9 furlongs 80 yards (~1850 metres)
 1973–1975 – 1850 metres
 1976–1996 – 1900 metres
 1997–1999 – 1800 metres 
 2000–2005 – 1900 metres
2006 onwards - 1600 metres

Grade
 1925–1979 - Principal race
 1980 onwards - Group 1 race

Venue
 1935–1996 - Canterbury Park Racecourse
 1997–1999 - Rosehill Gardens Racecourse
 2000–2005 - Canterbury Park Racecourse
 2006–2010 - Randwick Racecourse
 2011 - Warwick Farm Racecourse
 2012 - Randwick Racecourse
 2013 - Warwick Farm Racecourse
 2014 onwards - Randwick Racecourse

Winners

Randwick Guineas (2006– ) 

2023 - Communist
2022 - Converge
2021 - Lion's Roar
2020 - Shadow Hero
2019 - The Autumn Sun
2018 - Kementari
 2017 - Inference
 2016 - Le Romain
 2015 - Hallowed Crown
 2014 - Dissident
 2013 - It's A Dundeel
 2012 - Mosheen
 2011 - Ilovethiscity
 2010 - Shoot Out
 2009 - Metal Bender
 2008 - Weekend Hussler
 2007 - Mentality
 2006 - Hotel Grand

Canterbury Guineas (1935–2005) 

 2005 - Jymcarew
 2004 - Niello
 2003 - Fine Society
 2002 - Carnegie Express
 2001 - Universal Prince
 2000 - Fairway
 1999 - Arena
 1998 - Tycoon Lil
 1997 - Intergaze
 1996 - Octagonal
 1995 - Sharscay
 1994 - Western Red
 1993 - Kingston Bay
 1992 - Veandercross
 1991 - St. Jude
 1990 - Interstellar
 1989 - Riverina Charm
 1988 - High Regard
 1987 - Tidal Light
 1986 - Dolcezza
 1985 - Spirit Of Kingston
 1984 - Beechcraft
 1983 - Mr. McGinty
 1982 - Rare Form
 1981 - Ring The Bell
 1980 - Rocky Top
 1979 - Red Nose
 1978 - †race not held
 1977 - Belmura Lad
 1976 - Chasta Bellota
 1975 - Rosie Heir
 1974 - Sydney Cove
 1973 - Imagele
 1972 - Lord Ben
 1971 - Egyptian
 1970 - Royal Show
 1969 - Bogan Hero
 1968 - Broker's Tip
 1967 - Honeyland
 1966 - Garcon
 1965 - Fair Summer
 1964 - Strauss
 1963 - Summer Fiesta
 1962 - Summer Prince
 1961 - Kilshery
 1960 - Persian Lyric
 1959 - Martello Towers
 1958 - Prince Kerdieil
 1957 - Todman
 1956 - Movie Boy
 1955 - Aboukir
 1954 - Pride Of Egypt
 1953 - Prince Morvi
 1952 - Prince Dakhil
 1951 - Forest Beau
 1950 - French Cavalier
 1949 - Delta
 1948 - Riptide
 1947 - The Groom
 1946 - Decorate
 1945 - Monmouth
 1944 - Accession
 1943 - Moorland
 1942 - San Sebastian
 1941 - Chatham's Choice
 1940 - Ensign
 1939 - Bonny Loch
 1938 - Respirator
 1937 - Bristol
 1936 - Billy Boy
 1935 - Hadrian

† Change in scheduling of race from spring to autumn

See also
 List of Australian Group races
 Group races
 Australian Triple Crown of Thoroughbred Racing

References

External links
 First three placegetters Randwick Guineas (ATC)

Flat horse races for three-year-olds
Group 1 stakes races in Australia
Randwick Racecourse
Recurring sporting events established in 1935
1935 establishments in Australia